The Hampton Roads Gulls were a professional ice hockey team based in Hampton, VA. They were a member of the Atlantic Coast Hockey League in the 1982-83 season.

Season-by-season results

Notable players
 Oren Koules, producer of Two And A Half Men and the Saw series of movies. Along with former NHL player Len Barrie, he owned the NHL's Tampa Bay Lightning from 2008 until 2010.
 John Tortorella, played one game with the Gulls during the 1982–83 AHL season. He won the Jack Adams Trophy and the Stanley Cup as the coach of the Tampa Bay Lightning.

References 

Atlantic Coast Hockey League teams
Ice hockey clubs established in 1982
Sports clubs disestablished in 1983
Ice hockey teams in Virginia
1982 establishments in Virginia